Lennie Hibbert OD (born Leonard Aloysius Hibbert, 12 November 1928 - 8 September 1984) was a Jamaican musician who was bandmaster at the Alpha Cottage School, and also a vibraphone virtuoso, recording two albums for Studio One.

Biography
Hibbert was born in Mavis Bank, Jamaica in 1928. At the age of eight he began attending the Alpha School, where he joined the school band as a drummer. He left the school in 1944 and played in several small orchestras before joining the Military Band in 1946. While with the Military Band he taught himself to play the vibraphone. In 1955 he returned to Alpha as bandmaster, his students including Floyd Lloyd and Vin Gordon. He worked as a live musician in jazz groups in the 1960s, and frequently worked with the Sound Dimension band, recording some of the best-known riddims for Clement "Coxsone" Dodd. He recorded his debut solo album, Creation, for Dodd in 1969, comprising instrumentals featuring Hibbert's vibraphone playing. A single from the album, "Village Soul", has been described as "simply one of the most beautiful instrumentals ever to emerge from Brentford Road". A second album, More Creation, was issued in 1971. Hibbert went on to work with Harry Mudie, with the "Margaret's Dream" single issued in 1974. In 1976 he was awarded the Order of Distinction (O.D.) for his contribution to music on the island and for his youth work. Hibbert died on 8 September 1984 (aged 55). He is commemorated at Alpha by the Lennie Hibbert Hall. He received a posthumous "unsung hero" award from the Jamaican Reggae Industry Association (JARIA) in 2009.

Hibbert was the uncle of reggae singer Junior Delgado.

He also taught music at Ocho Rios Secondary school prior to his death while living in Content Gardens Ocho Rios

Discography

Albums
Moon-light Party at the Myrtle Bank Hotel (1961), Beach - The Lennie Hibbert Combo 
Creation (1969), Studio One
More Creation (1971), Studio One

Singles
"Pure Sole" (1967), Dr. Bird - Lennie Hibbert & Count Ossie Band
"Village Soul" (1969), Coxsone
"Montego Rock" (1971), Studio One
"Margaret's Dream" (1974), MHA
"Stick It Up" (1974), Moodisc
"Ital Vibes" (1974), Moodisc
"Far Beyond" (2001), Soul Jazz

Notes

References
Barrow, Steve & Dalton, Peter (2004) The Rough Guide to Reggae, 3rd edn., Rough Guides, 
Blowtorch, Eric (2007) "Reports from Kingston, Jamaica", OnMilwaukee.com, 20 June 2007
Chapman, Rob (1996) Downbeat Special, private press
Hyatt, Cottrell "History of Alpha Boys School", Alpha Old Boys Association
Katz, David (2000) People Funny Boy: the Genius of Lee "Scratch" Perry, Payback Press, 
Thompson, Dave (2002) Reggae & Caribbean Music, Backbeat Books, 
Walters, Basil (2009) "JARIA honours unsung heroes of Jamaican music", Jamaica Observer, 6 March 2009

External links
Lennie Hibbert at Roots Archives

1928 births
Year of death unknown
People from Saint Andrew Parish, Jamaica
Jamaican reggae musicians
Recipients of the Order of Distinction
1984 deaths